Angela Moroșanu (born 26 July 1986 in Iași) is a Romanian athlete.

Moroșanu was discovered by Albu Ştefan who became her first trainer whilst she was at school in Belcești, a village 40 km from Iaşi. She started out competing for sports clubs in Iaşi and Bacău. Currently, she represents CS Dinamo București.

At the 2004 Summer Olympics Moroșanu was part of the Romanian 4 × 400 m relay team. She finished 8th in the 200 m final at the 2006 European Athletics Championships in Gothenburg, where she also took part in the 400 m hurdles.

In 2007 Moroșanu became the European Under 23 Champion in the 400 m hurdles with a Championship Record time. At the 2008 Summer Olympics Moroșanu made it into the semifinals of the 400 m hurdles, finishing in 16th place overall.

At the 2009 World Championships in Athletics in Berlin, Moroșanu came last in the finals of the 400 m hurdles, with a time of 55.04s.

She reached the final of the 2010 European Championships.

At the 2012 European Championships, she reached the semifinal, and was part of the Romanian 4 × 400 m team that reached the final.  She again competed at the 2012 Summer Olympics, but did not qualify from the heats.

References 

 

1986 births
Living people
Sportspeople from Iași
Romanian female sprinters
Romanian female hurdlers
Athletes (track and field) at the 2004 Summer Olympics
Athletes (track and field) at the 2008 Summer Olympics
Athletes (track and field) at the 2012 Summer Olympics
Olympic athletes of Romania
World Athletics Indoor Championships medalists